Little Friends Club is a Bangladeshi football club based in Gopibagh, Dhaka. It currently competes in the Bangladesh Championship League is a second tier Bangladeshi football league.

History
The Little Friends Club is a football club from Gopibagh, Dhaka which was established in 1974. The team competes in the Bangladesh Championship League. The 2022–23 season will be the clubs inaugural season at the second level Bangladeshi football league. In October 2022 they fulfilled club licensing criteria and Bangladesh Football Federation (BFF) gave them permission to participate in 2022–23 season.

Current squad

Competitive record

Head coach records

Club management

Current technical staff
As of 27 October 2022

References

 sport in Dhaka
Football clubs in Bangladesh
Bangladesh Championship League
Association football clubs established in 1974